Briana Lane (born October 27, 1985) is an American actress and musician. She is best known for her recurring roles on Freeform's Young & Hungry and Switched at Birth and her portrayal of Brook Lynn Quartermaine on ABC's General Hospital, for which she was nominated for a Daytime Emmy in May 2021.

Career

Acting
Notable roles include recurs on American Horror Story, Extant, The New Normal, Baby Daddy and guest stars on Grace and Frankie, 9-1-1, American Housewife, NCIS and All American.

In August 2020, Lane was announced as the recast for lead character Brook Lynn Quartermaine on the ABC Daytime soap opera General Hospital with Amanda Setton on maternity leave. Lane played the role until Nov. 16, 2020 and quickly became a fan favorite. On May 25, 2021, she was nominated for a Daytime Emmy for Outstanding Guest Performer in a Drama Series. In October 2022, Lane came back on the show to play the character again.

Music
Musician Darian Zahedi of CRX and Lane released a new single, Bad, under a music project called Cadeaux. The track premiered on September 17, 2020, and was mixed by Shane Stoneback (Vampire Weekend, Rostam, Cults). Cadeaux released its next single Either Way on February 24, 2022. Lane said in an interview on March 23, 2022, that both Cadeaux and Winslow would release several new tracks in 2023.

Lane is half of indie duo Winslow with bandmate Kate Miner. The band is signed with Kobalt under AWAL Records. Their song Origami Tiger was featured on the soundtrack for the film Luce starring Octavia Spencer and Naomi Watts.

Hosting and writing
Lane got her start as a writer for an animated show on CBS interactive after graduating college which led her to do on-camera hosting work for the network. She has hosted for E! News, MSN, and CBS. In 2015, she co-anchored a comedy news show called The Desk for Uproxx under Woven Digital.

Personal life
Lane was born in Los Angeles, CA and attended Marymount High School. She graduated with a BA from UCLA's School of Film, Theater and Television with an emphasis in musical theater.

She trained at Upright Citizen's Brigade and performs with an indie comedy team.

Lane is a member of UNICEF's Next Gen and a longtime supporter of The Arthritis Foundation. She also supports the Huntington's Disease Society of America and helps host fundraising events for the organization.

Filmography

Awards and nominations

References

External links

1985 births
Living people
American film actresses
American television actresses
Actresses from Los Angeles
UCLA Film School alumni
21st-century American women